Quinton Narkle (born 3 December 1997) is an Australian rules footballer who last played for the Geelong Cats in the Australian Football League (AFL). He made his debut in round 15 of the 2018 season against the Western Bulldogs at Docklands Stadium.

Narkle, from Western Australia, attended Wesley College and originally played for West Australian Football League club Perth Demons. He played for his state at the AFL Under 18 Championships, averaging 16 disposals. Narkle was drafted by Geelong with pick 60 in the 2016 national draft. In June 2017, he ruptured his anterior cruciate ligament while training and did not return until May 2018. Narkle played six Victorian Football League matches before his debut. Commenting on Narkle's debut performance, coach Chris Scott said "we thought he was outstanding".

Narkle is an Indigenous Australian, distantly related to former Swan Districts, West Coast Eagles and St Kilda footballer Phil Narkle.

Narkle was delisted by Geelong at the end of the 2022 season.

Statistics
Updated to the end of the 2022 season.

|-
| 2018 ||  || 19
| 6 || 5 || 2 || 31 || 42 || 73 || 13 || 14 || 0.8 || 0.3 || 5.2 || 7.0 || 12.2 || 2.2 || 2.3 || 0
|-
| 2019 ||  || 19
| 6 || 5 || 4 || 59 || 44 || 103 || 14 || 18 || 0.8 || 0.7 || 9.8 || 7.3 || 17.2 || 2.3 || 3.0 || 0
|-
| 2020 ||  || 19
| 5 || 0 || 1 || 27 || 30 || 57 || 9 || 18 || 0.0 || 0.2 || 5.4 || 6.0 || 11.4 || 1.8 || 3.6 || 0
|-
| 2021 ||  || 19
| 16 || 4 || 4 || 86 || 129 || 215 || 37 || 25 || 0.3 || 0.3 || 5.4 || 8.1 || 13.4 || 2.3 || 1.6 || 2
|-
| 2022 ||  || 19
| 8 || 4 || 3 || 40 || 28 || 68 || 21 || 8 || 0.5 || 0.4 || 5.0 || 3.5 || 8.5 || 2.6 || 1.0 || 0
|- class=sortbottom
! colspan=3 | Career
! 41 !! 18 !! 14 !! 243 !! 273 !! 516 !! 94 !! 83 !! 0.4 !! 0.3 !! 5.9 !! 6.7 !! 12.6 !! 2.3 !! 2.0 !! 2
|}

Notes

References

External links 
 

Living people
1997 births
Indigenous Australian players of Australian rules football
Geelong Football Club players
Perth Football Club players
Australian rules footballers from Western Australia
People educated at Wesley College, Perth